The Southwest Journal was an American, English language free community paper covering 21 neighborhoods in Southwest Minneapolis. It was family owned and was founded in 1990. It covered the following neighborhoods:

Bryn Mawr
Lowry Hill
Stevens Square
Whittier
Lyndale
Lowry Hill East (the Wedge)
Kenwood
East Isles
ECCO
West Maka Ska
Kingfield
East Harriet
Linden Hills
Cedar-Isles-Dean
Fulton
Lynnhurst
Armatage
Kenny
Windom
South Uptown
Tangletown

On December 17, 2020, the newspaper printed its last edition.

References

Newspapers published in Minnesota
Mass media in Minneapolis–Saint Paul
Publications established in 1990
Newspapers published in Minneapolis–Saint Paul, Minnesota